Tadeusz Gapiński (born 7 January 1948 in Poland) is a Polish retired footballer.

References

Polish footballers
1948 births
Living people
Association football midfielders
Association football forwards